Konak Tram is a  urban light rail transit (LRT) system in Konak district of Izmir, Turkey and is one of the two lines of Tram İzmir. The line serves 19 stations and began operating on 24 April 2018.

The tram line runs between Fahrettin Altay Square, Konak and Halkapınar. It is part of the Karşıyaka and Konak Tram project of İzmir Metropolitan Municipality, which cost nearly  450 million (approx. US$120 million).

The Konak tram is operated by the İzmir Metro. It has 21 tramcars, produced by Hyundai Rotem plant in Adapazarı. The double-ended -long five-module tramcars are each 43.1 t heavy. They have 48 seating capacity, and can carry up to 285 passengers each. The electrification system of the tramcars is 750 V DC. The line has a  communications-based train control (CBTC) signalling system.

See also
Trams İzmir
Karşıyaka Tram

References

Tram transport in İzmir
Railway lines opened in 2018
2018 establishments in Turkey
Konak District